Kaaru  is a village in Põlva Parish, Põlva County in southeastern Estonia.

Writer, journalist and artist Jaan Vahtra (1882–1947) was born in Kaaru.

References

 

Villages in Põlva County